The Czech Athletics Championships is an annual track and field competition which serves as the national championship for Czech Republic. It is organised by Czech Athletics Federation, the Czech Republic's national governing body for the sport of athletics. It superseded the Czechoslovak Athletics Championships as the national championship in 1993 upon Czech independence, though the competition was hosted as a sub-national event prior to then. A Czech Championships was held in 1970, separate from the Czechoslovak event that year.

Men

100 metres
1993: Jiří Valík
1994: Jiří Valík
1995: Jiří Valík
1996: Ivan Šlehobr
1997: Martin Duda
1998: Ivan Šlehobr
1999: Martin Duda
2000: Martin Duda
2001: Vít Havlícek
2002: Radek Zachoval
2003: Jiří Vojtík
2004: Martin Bren
2005: Jan Stokláska
2006: Rostislav Šulc

200 metres
1993: Jiří Valík
1994: Jiří Valík
1995: Jiří Valík
1996: Ivan Šlehobr
1997: Martin Morkes
1998: Martin Morkes
1999: Martin Morkes
2000: Vít Havlícek
2001: Jiří Vojtík
2002: Jiří Vojtík
2003: Jiří Vojtík
2004: Jiří Vojtík
2005: Jiří Vojtík
2006: Jiří Vojtík

400 metres
1993: Petr Puncochár
1994: Jiří Benda
1995: Jan Štejfa
1996: Jan Poděbradský
1997: Jiří Švenek
1998: Jan Poděbradský
1999: Karel Bláha
2000: Karel Bláha
2001: Karel Bláha
2002: Karel Bláha
2003: Václav Bláha
2004: Jan Hanzl
2005: Karel Bláha
2006: Karel Bláha

800 metres
1993: Václav Hrích
1994: Pavel Soukup
1995: Pavel Soukup
1996: Filip Jedlík
1997: Lukáš Vydra
1998: Lukáš Vydra
1999: Karel Znojil
2000: Roman Oravec
2001: Stanislav Tábor
2002: Ondrej Kricka
2003: Roman Oravec
2004: Michal Šneberger
2005: Michal Šneberger
2006: Michal Šneberger

1500 metres
1993: Milan Drahonovský
1994: Milan Drahonovský
1995: Milan Drahonovský
1996: Miloslav Suchý
1997: Miloslav Suchý
1998: Ondřej Moravec
1999: Lubomír Pokorný
2000: Michal Šneberger
2001: Michal Šneberger
2002: Michal Šneberger
2003: Petr Mlatecek
2004: Vladimír Bartunek
2005: Vladimír Bartunek
2006: Petr Doubravský

5000 metres
1993: Jan Pešava
1994: Radim Kuncický
1995: Radomír Soukup
1996: Milan Drahonovský
1997: Milan Drahonovský
1998: Pavel Faschingbauer
1999: Pavel Faschingbauer
2000: Michael Nejedlý
2001: Tomáš Krutský
2002: Tomáš Krutský
2003: Michael Nejedlý
2004: Martin Kučera
2005: Jan Bláha
2006: Róbert Štefko

10,000 metres
1993: Miroslav Sajler
1994: Jan Pešava
1995: Jan Pešava
1996: Jan Pešava
1997: Jan Pešava
1998: Jan Pešava
1999: Jiří Hnilicka
2000: Pavel Faschingbauer
2001: Pavel Faschingbauer
2002: Pavel Faschingbauer
2003: Jan Bláha
2004: Róbert Štefko
2005: Pavel Faschingbauer
2006: Jan Kreisinger

10K run
1993: Michal Kučera
1994: Jan Pešava
1995: Luboš Šubrt
1996: Jan Pešava
1997: Jan Pešava
1998: Michal Jeránek
1999: Pavel Faschingbauer
2000: Tomáš Krutský
2001: Pavel Faschingbauer
2002: Pavel Faschingbauer
2003: David Gerych
2004: Róbert Štefko
2005: Róbert Štefko

Half marathon
1994: Jan Bláha
1995: Luboš Šubrt
1996: Zdenek Mezuliáník
1997: Jan Pešava
1998: Jiří Hajzler
1999: Pavel Faschingbauer
2000: Miroslav Vítek
2001: Jan Bláha
2002: Pavel Faschingbauer
2003: Pavel Faschingbauer
2004: Róbert Štefko
2005: Jan Bláha

Marathon
1993: Rudolf Jun
1994: Petr Klimeš
1995: Petr Bukovjan
1996: Vlastimil Bikovjan
1997: Václav Ožana
1998: Pavel Kryska
1999: Pavel Kryska
2000: Jan Bláha
2001: Jan Bláha
2002: Jiří Wallenfels
2003: Jan Bláha
2004: Róbert Štefko
2005: Jan Bláha
2006: Pavel Faschingbauer

3000 metres steeplechase
1993: Jiří Šoptenko
1994: Jiří Šoptenko
1995: Michael Nejedlý
1996: Michael Nejedlý
1997: Michael Nejedlý
1998: Michael Nejedlý
1999: Michael Nejedlý
2000: Michael Nejedlý
2001: Michael Nejedlý
2002: Michael Nejedlý
2003: Michael Nejedlý
2004: Michael Nejedlý
2005: Michael Nejedlý
2006: David Gerych

110 metres hurdles
1993: Jiří Hudec
1994: Tomáš Dvořák
1995: Tomáš Dvořák
1996: Tomáš Dvořák
1997: Tomáš Dvořák
1998: Tomáš Dvořák
1999: Tomáš Dvořák
2000: Tomáš Dvořák
2001: Tomáš Dvořák
2002: Roman Šebrle
2003: Stanislav Sajdok
2004: Stanislav Sajdok
2005: Stanislav Sajdok
2006: Stanislav Sajdok

400 metres hurdles
1993: Petr Holubec
1994: Václav Novotný
1995: Lukáš Soucek
1996: Lukáš Soucek
1997: Jiří Mužík
1998: Štepán Tesarík
1999: Josef Rous
2000: Josef Rous
2001: Jiří Mužík
2002: Jiří Mužík
2003: Štepán Tesarík
2004: Jiří Mužík
2005: Michal Uhlík
2006: Michal Uhlík

High jump
1993: Tomáš Janků
1994: Tomáš Janků
1995: Jan Janků
1996: Tomáš Janků
1997: Jan Janků
1998: Tomáš Janků
1999: Tomáš Janků
2000: Tomáš Janků
2001: Jan Janků
2002: Tomáš Janků
2003: Jaroslav Bába
2004: Svatoslav Ton
2005: Jaroslav Bába
2006: Tomáš Janků

Pole vault
1993: Zdeněk Lubenský
1994: Martin Kysela
1995: Zdenek Šafár
1996: Martin Kysela
1997: Martin Kysela
1998: Štěpán Janáček
1999: Štěpán Janáček
2000: Štěpán Janáček
2001: Štěpán Janáček
2002: Adam Ptáček
2003: Adam Ptáček
2004: Adam Ptáček
2005: Aleš Honcl
2006: Adam Ptáček

Long jump
1993: Milan Gombala
1994: Milan Gombala
1995: Milan Gombala
1996: Milan Gombala
1997: Milan Kovár
1998: Roman Šebrle
1999: Roman Orlík
2000: Milan Kovár
2001: Milan Kovár
2002: Petr Hnízdil
2003: Petr Hnízdil
2004: Petr Lampart
2005: Štepán Wagner
2006: Tomáš Pour

Triple jump
1993: Jaroslav Mrštík
1994: Michal Coubal
1995: Radek Rezác
1996: Radek Rezác
1997: Jiří Kuntoš
1998: Jiří Kuntoš
1999: Jiří Kuntoš
2000: Jiří Kuntoš
2001: Tomáš Cholenský
2002: Petr Hnízdil
2003: Petr Hnízdil
2004: Tomáš Cholenský
2005: Tomáš Cholenský
2006: Petr Hnízdil

Shot put
1993: Miroslav Menc
1994: Miroslav Menc
1995: Miroslav Menc
1996: Miroslav Menc
1997: Miroslav Menc
1998: Petr Stehlík
1999: Petr Stehlík
2000: Miroslav Menc
2001: Petr Stehlík
2002: Petr Stehlík
2003: Petr Stehlík
2004: Petr Stehlík
2005: Petr Stehlík
2006: Remigius Machura

Discus throw
1993: Imrich Bugár
1994: Imrich Bugár
1995: Marek Bílek
1996: Libor Malina
1997: Libor Malina
1998: Libor Malina
1999: Libor Malina
2000: Libor Racek
2001: Libor Malina
2002: Libor Malina
2003: Libor Malina
2004: Libor Malina
2005: Libor Malina
2006: Libor Malina

Hammer throw
1993: Pavel Sedláček
1994: Pavel Sedláček
1995: Pavel Sedláček
1996: Pavel Sedláček
1997: Pavel Sedláček
1998: Vladimír Maška
1999: Vladimír Maška
2000: Vladimír Maška
2001: Vladimír Maška
2002: Vladimír Maška
2003: Lukáš Melich
2004: Vladimír Maška
2005: Vladimír Maška
2006: Lukáš Melich

Javelin throw
1993: Miloš Steigauf
1994: Jan Železný
1995: Vladimír Novácek
1996: Jan Železný
1997: Patrick Landmesser
1998: Patrick Landmesser
1999: Patrick Landmesser
2000: Miroslav Guzdek
2001: Miroslav Guzdek
2002: Miroslav Guzdek
2003: Miroslav Guzdek
2004: Radek Pejrimovský
2005: Petr Belunek
2006: Jan Syrovátko

Decathlon
1993: Kamil Damašek
1994: Kamil Damašek
1995: Kamil Damašek
1996: Roman Šebrle
1997: Kamil Damašek
1998: Aleš Paštrnák
1999: Tomáš Komenda
2000: Aleš Paštrnák
2001: Pavel Havlícek
2002: Jan Poděbradský
2003: Vít Zákoucký
2004: Jan Poděbradský
2005: Josef Karas
2006: Josef Karas

20 kilometres walk
1993: Jiří Malysa
1994: Hubert Sonnek
1995: Hubert Sonnek
1996: Hubert Sonnek
1997: Tomáš Kratochvíl
1998: Jiří Malysa
1999: Jiří Malysa
2000: Jiří Malysa
2001: Jiří Malysa
2002: Jiří Malysa
2003: Miloš Holuša
2004: Miloš Holuša
2005: Miloš Holuša
2006: Miloš Holuša

50 kilometres walk
1993: Miloš Holuša
1994: Roman Bílek
1995: Hubert Sonnek
1996: Hubert Sonnek
1997: Hubert Sonnek
1998: Jaroslav Makovec
1999: Hubert Sonnek
2000: Miloš Holuša
2001: František Kmenta
2002: Jiří Šorm
2003: Miloš Holuša
2004: Jiří Malysa
2005: David Šnajdr
2006: Rudolf Cogan

Cross country (long course)
1993: Jan Pešava
1994: Michal Kučera
1995: Michal Kučera
1996: Michal Kučera
1997: Jan Pešava
1998: Pavel Faschingbauer
1999: Pavel Faschingbauer
2000: Pavel Faschingbauer
2001: Tomáš Krutský
2002: Tomáš Krutský
2003: David Gerych
2004: Pavel Faschingbauer
2005: David Gerych

Cross country (short course)
1998: Michal Vokolek
1999: Tomáš Krutský
2000: Tomáš Krutský
2001: Zdenek Dúbravcík
2002: Zdenek Dúbravcík
2003: Jiří Miler
2004: Michael Nejedlý
2005: Jiří Miler

Mountain running
1993: Radomír Soukup
1994: Ladislav Raim
1995: Radomír Soukup
1996: Jan Pešava
1997: Radomír Soukup
1998: Miroslav Vítek
1999: Pavel Faschingbauer
2000: Jan Bláha
2001: Pavel Faschingbauer
2002: Pavel Faschingbauer
2003: Jan Bláha
2004: Miroslav Vítek
2005: Jan Havlícek

Women

100 metres
1993: Hana Benešová
1994: Erika Suchovská
1995: Zdenka Mušínská
1996: Gabriela Švecová
1997: Hana Benešová
1998: Erika Suchovská
1999: Erika Suchovská
2000: Lenka Ficková
2001: Erika Suchovská
2002: Hana Benešová
2003: Tereza Košková
2004: Štepánka Klapácová
2005: Štepánka Klapácová
2006: Kristina Bažatová

200 metres
1993: Hana Benešová
1994: Erika Suchovská
1995: Erika Suchovská
1996: Hana Benešová
1997: Pavlína Vostatková
1998: Pavlína Vostatková
1999: Hana Benešová
2000: Helena Fuchsová
2001: Lenka Ficková
2002: Hana Benešová
2003: Hana Benešová
2004: Štepánka Klapácová
2005: Denisa Rosolová
2006: Štepánka Klapácová

400 metres
1993: Nadežda Koštovalová
1994: Nadežda Koštovalová
1995: Hana Benešová
1996: Helena Fuchsová
1997: Helena Fuchsová
1998: Jitka Burianová
1999: Helena Fuchsová
2000: Jitka Burianová
2001: Tereza Žížalová
2002: Ludmila Formanová
2003: Eva Follnerová
2004: Zuzana Bergrová
2005: Jitka Bartoničková
2006: Zuzana Hejnová

800 metres
1993: Eva Kasalová
1994: Ludmila Formanová
1995: Ludmila Formanová
1996: Eva Kasalová
1997: Ludmila Formanová
1998: Eva Kasalová
1999: Ludmila Formanová
2000: Ludmila Formanová
2001: Petra Sedláková
2002: Renata Hoppová
2003: Petra Lochmanová
2004: Veronika Mrácková
2005: Petra Lochmanová
2006: Veronika Mrácková

1500 metres
1993: Ivana Kubešová
1994: Vera Kuncická
1995: Andrea Šuldesová
1996: Romana Sanigová
1997: Renata Hoppová
1998: Michaela Kutišová
1999: Andrea Šuldesová
2000: Renata Hoppová
2001: Renata Hoppová
2002: Renata Hoppová
2003: Andrea Šuldesová
2004: Andrea Šuldesová
2005: Marcela Lustigová
2006: Tereza Capková

3000 metres
1993: Vera Kuncická
1994: Vera Kuncická

5000 metres
1995: Anna Bácová
1996: Jana Kuceríková
1997: Jana Kuceríková
1998: Petra Drajzajtlová
1999: Petra Drajzajtlová
2000: Alena Peterková
2001: Jana Klimešová
2002: Petra Kamínková
2003: Michaela Mannová
2004: Vendula Frintová
2005: Petra Kamínková
2006: Petra Kamínková

10,000 metres
1993: Radka Pátková
1994: Alena Peterková
1995: Monika Deverová
1996: Iva Jurková
1997: Iva Jurková
1998: Jana Klimešová
1999: Renata Kvitová
2000: Alena Peterková
2001: Marie Volná
2002: Petra Kamínková
2003: Petra Kamínková
2004: Petra Kamínková
2005: Petra Kamínková
2006: Petra Kamínková

10K run
1993: Alena Peterková
1994: Desana Šourková
1995: Desana Šourková
1996: Iva Jurková
1997: Jana Klimešová
1998: Jana Klimešová
1999: Petra Drajzajtlová
2000: Petra Drajzajtlová
2001: Petra Drajzajtlová
2002: Petra Kamínková
2003: Petra Kamínková
2004: Petra Kamínková
2005: Petra Kamínková

Half marathon
1994: Radka Pátková
1995: Alena Peterková
1996: Monika Deverová
1997: Iva Jurková
1998: Dita Hebelková
1999: Jana Klimešová
2000: Renata Kvitová
2001: Petra Drajzajtlová
2002: Jana Klimešová
2003: Irena Šádková
2004: Radka Churánová
2005: Jana Klimešová

Marathon
1993: Alena Peterková
1994: Alena Peterková
1995: Alena Peterková
1996: Katerina Gerová-Sromová
1997: Vlasta Ruclová
1998: Tatána Metelková
1999: Tatána Metelková
2000: Alena Peterková
2001: Alena Peterková
2002: Jana Klimešová
2003: Ivana Martincová
2004: Radka Churánová
2005: Ivana Martincová
2006: Ivana Martincová

3000 metres steeplechase
2001: Zuzana Rücklová
2002: Jana Biolková
2003: Jana Biolková
2004: Michaela Mannová
2005: Barbora Kuncová
2006: Lenka Ptácková

100 metres hurdles
1993: Iveta Rudová
1994: Iveta Rudová
1995: Petra Šímová
1996: Iveta Rudová
1997: Iveta Rudová
1998: Andrea Novotná
1999: Iveta Rudová
2000: Michaela Hejnová
2001: Lucie Škrobáková
2002: Michaela Hejnová
2003: Lucie Škrobáková
2004: Lucie Škrobáková
2005: Lucie Škrobáková
2006: Petra Seidlová

400 metres hurdles
1993: Zuzana Machotková
1994: Ivana Sekyrová
1995: Dagmar Votocková
1996: Dagmar Urbánková
1997: Martina Blažková
1998: Martina Blažková
1999: Dagmar Votocková
2000: Dagmar Votocková
2001: Alena Rücklová
2002: Alena Rücklová
2003: Lucie Sichertová
2004: Alena Rücklová
2005: Alena Rücklová
2006: Alena Rücklová

High jump
1993: Šárka Nováková
1994: Zuzana Hlavoňová
1995: Zuzana Hlavoňová
1996: Zuzana Hlavoňová
1997: Zuzana Hlavoňová
1998: Inga Janku
1999: Zuzana Hlavoňová
2000: Zuzana Hlavoňová
2001: Barbora Laláková
2002: Zuzana Hlavoňová
2003: Zuzana Hlavoňová
2004: Romana Dubnová
2005: Iva Straková
2006: Barbora Laláková

Pole vault
1993: Daniela Bártová
1994: Daniela Bártová
1995: Daniela Bártová
1996: Daniela Bártová
1997: Daniela Bártová
1998: Daniela Bártová
1999: Pavla Hamáčková-Rybová
2000: Daniela Bártová
2001: Kateřina Baďurová
2002: Šárka Mládková
2003: Pavla Hamáčková-Rybová
2004: Kateřina Baďurová
2005: Pavla Hamáčková-Rybová
2006: Pavla Hamáčková-Rybová

Long jump
1993: Monika Kohoutová
1994: Gabriela Vánová
1995: Helena Vinarová
1996: Helena Vinarová
1997: Martina Žabková
1998: Martina Žabková
1999: Martina Šestáková
2000: Šárka Beránková
2001: Lucie Komrsková
2002: Lucie Komrsková
2003: Lucie Komrsková
2004: Denisa Rosolová
2005: Martina Šestáková
2006: Lucie Komrsková

Triple jump
1993: Šárka Kašpárková
1994: Šárka Kašpárková
1995: Alena Nezdarilová
1996: Šárka Kašpárková
1997: Šárka Kašpárková
1998: Šárka Kašpárková
1999: Eva Doležalová
2000: Šárka Kašpárková
2001: Dagmar Urbánková
2002: Jana Velďáková
2003: Martina Šestáková
2004: Šárka Kašpárková
2005: Martina Šestáková
2006: Šárka Kašpárková

Shot put
1993: Sona Vašícková
1994: Alice Matějková
1995: Zdeňka Šilhavá
1996: Zdeňka Šilhavá
1997: Zdeňka Šilhavá
1998: Lucie Vrbenská
1999: Zdeňka Šilhavá
2000: Zdeňka Šilhavá
2001: Věra Pospíšilová-Cechlová
2002: Věra Pospíšilová-Cechlová
2003: Jana Kárníková
2004: Jana Kárníková
2005: Jana Kárníková
2006: Jana Kárníková

Discus throw
1993: Vladimíra Racková
1994: Alice Matějková
1995: Zdeňka Šilhavá
1996: Alice Matějková
1997: Alice Matějková
1998: Alice Matějková
1999: Zdeňka Šilhavá
2000: Vladimíra Racková
2001: Vladimíra Racková
2002: Vladimíra Racková
2003: Věra Pospíšilová-Cechlová
2004: Věra Pospíšilová-Cechlová
2005: Věra Pospíšilová-Cechlová
2006: Věra Pospíšilová-Cechlová

Hammer throw
1995: Markéta Procházková
1996: Markéta Procházková
1997: Markéta Procházková
1998: Jana Lejsková
1999: Lucie Vrbenská
2000: Lucie Vrbenská
2001: Lucie Vrbenská
2002: Lucie Vrbenská
2003: Lucie Vrbenská
2004: Lucie Vrbenská
2005: Lucie Vrbenská
2006: Lenka Ledvinová

Javelin throw
1993: Nikola Brejchová
1994: Nikola Brejchová
1995: Nikola Brejchová
1996: Nikola Brejchová
1997: Nikola Brejchová
1998: Nikola Brejchová
1999: Nikola Brejchová
2000: Nikola Brejchová
2001: Nikola Brejchová
2002: Nikola Brejchová
2003: Barbora Špotáková
2004: Nikola Brejchová
2005: Barbora Špotáková
2006: Barbora Špotáková

Heptathlon
1993: Dagmar Urbánková
1994: Dana Jandová
1995: Katerina Nekolná
1996: Helena Vinarová
1997: Jana Klecková
1998: Katerina Nekolná
1999: Katerina Nekolná
2000: Šárka Beránková
2001: Katerina Nekolná
2002: Šárka Beránková
2003: 
2004: Michaela Hejnová
2005: Michaela Hejnová
2006: Denisa Rosolová

10 kilometres walk
1993: Kamila Holpuchová
1994: Kamila Holpuchová
1995: Kamila Holpuchová
1996: Tamara Heroldová
1997: Tamara Heroldová
1998: Pavla Choderová
1999: Ludmila Rychnovská
2000: Lucie Nedomová

20 kilometres walk
2001: Barbora Dibelková
2002: Barbora Dibelková
2003: Barbora Dibelková
2004: Barbora Dibelková
2005: Barbora Dibelková
2006: Lucie Pelantová

Cross country
1993: Vera Kuncická
1994: Desana Šourková
1995: Desana Šourková
1996: Jana Klimešová
1997: Jana Klimešová
1998: Alena Peterková
1999: Petra Drajzajtlová
2000: Jana Biolková
2001: Jana Klimešová
2002: Jana Biolková
2003: Jana Biolková
2004: Irena Petríková
2005: Vendula Frintová

Mountain running
1993: Dagmar Havlícková
1994: Dagmar Havlícková
1995: Renata Schlesingerová
1996: Dita Hebelková
1997: Anna Bácová
1998: Dita Hebelková
1999: Irena Šádková
2000: Anna Pichrtová
2001: Anna Pichrtová
2002: Irena Šádková
2003: Irena Šádková
2004: Pavla Havlová
2005: Anna Pichrtová

References

Champions 1993–2006
Czech Championships. GBR Athletics. Retrieved 2021-04-17.

Winners
 List
Czech Championships
Athletics